Cabueñes is a parish of the municipality of Gijón, in Asturias, Spain.

Its population was 1,467 in 2012.

Cabueñes is a residential area and a public services district which borders the municipality of Villaviciosa in the east.

In this parish are located several important buildings like the University of Oviedo campus, the most important hospital of the city, the largest morgue in Gijón and the Laboral University, the largest building in Spain. In the Laboral University is located the RTPA headquarters and the LABoral Centro de Arte y Creación Industrial.

The Science park of Gijón and the Atlantic Botanical Garden are also in this parish.

Villages and their neighbourhoods
Cefontes
El Tragamón
La Vega
Cimavilla
La Cabaña
La Cuesta
La Frontera
La Rasa
La Pontica
L'Infanzón
La Mangada

References

External links
 Official Toponyms - Principality of Asturias website.
 Official Toponyms: Laws - BOPA Nº 229 - Martes, 3 de octubre de 2006 & DECRETO 105/2006, de 20 de septiembre, por el que se determinan los topónimos oficiales del concejo de Gijón.

Parishes in Gijón